An enginator is an internal combustion engine whose fuel supply comes directly from underground deposits or from waste gas produced from a land fill.  Its fuel supply will last as long as the natural deposit.

Enginators are currently built by the Waukesha Engines company and have been featured on the Modern Marvels Episode "Horsepower".

Other references: DC, Darren J Cloete

Internal combustion engine